Bad Education is a 2022 Taiwanese crime mystery action film directed by Kai Ko in his directorial debut. The film received four nominations at the 59th Golden Horse Awards, including Best New Director for Ko. The film stars Kent Tsai, Edison Song and Berant Zhu.

Premise

Cast
 Kent Tsai
 Edison Song
 Berant Zhu
 Leon Dai as Xing
 Hong Yu-hong as Tai
 Chang Ning as Police officer
 Huang Hsin-yao as Police officer

Production
In January 2020, it was reported that Giddens Ko was attached to Bad Education, and the project was one of the 33 projects shortlisted for that year's Hong Kong-Asia Film Financing Forum (HAF).

Principal photography began in January 2022, with Kai Ko replacing Giddens Ko as the director. Filming concluded in April 2022.

Awards and nominations

References

External links
 
 

2022 films
2022 crime action films
2020s mystery films
Taiwanese crime action films
Taiwanese mystery films
2020s Mandarin-language films
2022 directorial debut films